Bangor Amateurs Football Club is a Northern Irish, intermediate football club playing in Division 1B of the Northern Amateur Football League. The club is based in Bangor, County Down, and was formed in 1969. The club plays in the Irish Cup.

Honours

Intermediate honours
Clarence Cup: 1
2002–03

References

External links
 Club website

Association football clubs in Northern Ireland
Association football clubs established in 1969
Association football clubs in County Down
Northern Amateur Football League clubs
1969 establishments in Northern Ireland